TMMC Cancer Center (Vietnamese: Trung Tâm Ung Bướu, Bệnh viện Ung Bướu, Trung Tâm Ung Thư, Bệnh viện Ung thư TMMC) is a specialized cancer hospital and also the first medical center of this type in Vietnam. Initiated by Dr Dilshaad Ali, the founder and President of TMMC Healthcare, TMMC Cancer Center was founded with the purpose to provide the accessibility of oncology treatment for Vietnamese patients. The center is a private Vietnam-Japan private healthcare project initiative.

History 
Cancer is among the key contributors to the mortality of Vietnamese.

Yearly, the center organizes tens of public seminars to raise awareness about breast cancer, cervical cancer, lung cancer, and liver cancer across the country. It is also the first private institute in Vietnam, advocating for the National Breast Cancer Awareness Month of WHO through a nation-wide seminar and free screening tests for tens of thousands of patients. In 2014, TMMC Cancer was invested in by the Japanese Sojitz Corporation  and its medical partner, Capita Medica to develop a strategic Center of Excellence. The project was initiated by Dr Dilshaad Ali, founding President and Group Chief Executive Director, and Tran Quoc Bao, Group Business Development Director,

Training 
Since 2014, the center has opened admission for Elective (medical) and fellowship programs.

Services 
 Chemotherapy
 Radiotherapy
 Surgical Oncology

Sub-specialties 
 Breast cancer
 Colorectal
 Genitourinary
 Gynecology
 Head & Neck / Nasopharynx Cancer (NPC)
 Lymphoma
 Sarcoma
 Thoracic
 Thyroid

References

Hospitals in Vietnam